3 male athletes and no female athletes represented Bahrain at the 2000 Summer Paralympics.

Medallists

See also
Bahrain at the 2000 Summer Olympics
Bahrain at the Paralympics

References

Bibliography

External links
International Paralympic Committee

Nations at the 2000 Summer Paralympics
Paralympics
2000